Micronet 800 was an information provider (IP) on Prestel, aimed at the 1980s personal computer market. It was an online magazine that gave subscribers computer related news, reviews, general subject articles and downloadable telesoftware.

Users would log onto the Prestel network (which was usually a local call) and then access the Micronet 800 home page by entering *800# (hence the name) on their modem or computer.  Most Micronet 800 members would have their default main index page set to page 800 automatically.

History
The name Micronet 800 derives from its home page, 800, on the BT Prestel videotext service.

Micronet 800 derived from the earlier development in 1980 and 1981 of 'Electronic Insight' by Bob Denton. Electronic Insight was a Prestel-based feature-and-price-comparison site listing computers, calculators and other electronic and IT products, whose main page was on page 800 of Prestel.  Electronic Insight was acquired by Telemap Group, a part of EMAP, East Midland (note, not Midlands) Allied Press, in 1982 on the recommendation of Richard Hease, a number of whose computer magazines EMAP had just bought.  Telemap had been formed in 1981 to explore the opportunities of British Telecom's Prestel videotext service.  It had been looking at the horticultural market that EMAP served with a number of magazine titles, notably providing a 'Closed User Group' purchasing network for garden centre businesses, complementing EMAP's printed 'Garden Trade News' magazine. But horticulturalists and IT proved not to be a natural marriage, and the service had insufficient users to make it viable.

Richard Hease, in 1982 Chairman of EMAP's Computer & Business Press which had acquired Electronic Insight, organised a pitch to the Telemap Group by David Babsky of a projected interactive online computer magazine to replace the existing content of Electronic Insight. Babsky showed a 'dummy issue' of the intended online magazine, programmed in Integer BASIC on an Apple II computer. Hease suggested that there be several different 'areas' of the magazine, with titles such as MicroNews, MicroNet (for those interested in networking), etc., and Babsky proposed that the entire project be called 'Micronet 800' to ensure that it could be easily found by anyone using Prestel, as its page number would be part of its name. Hease and Denton negotiated with BT Prestel for a special relationship that would rank it alongside the Nottingham Building Society's plans for its Homelink as the two key thrusts for Prestel.

Hease negotiated with then telecoms minister John Butcher a £25 subsidy for Micronet subscribers to have their homes equipped free with a telephone jack-socket for the relevant modem.

The Telemap editorial staff was first based at 8 Herbal Hill, Clerkenwell, London (after the preliminary discussions and presentation at EMAP's offices in Hatton Garden), and the technical staff in an EMAP building in Peterborough. In 1986 the technical staff moved down to the London building.

Telemap was to be the base for Micronet 800 and the editorial development of the site. Hease's and Denton's "Prism Micro Products", the exclusive distributor of Sinclair Computers in the UK, was charged with developing the required modems for the enterprise, to ensure that Micronet 800's pages could be accessed by such microcomputers as Apple II, ZX81, BBC Micro, Dragon 32/64, IBM PCs, PET, and subsequently the ZX Spectrum, Sinclair QL, Camputers Lynx, VIC-20, Commodore 64, and other 1980s home computers.

Although fast by contemporary standards, Prestel modems were quite slow from today's point of view (1200 baud download, 75 upload) and the display was just 24 lines of 40 characters, with seven colours and very simple block graphics. Yet Micronet 800 had versions of many of the Internet's subsequent features, especially an interactive 'ChatLine' (similar to Internet Relay Chat) developed by Mike Brown, who joined Micronet 800 from the Council for Educational Technology, where he'd devised a standard UK format for downloadable programs which became known as 'telesoftware'.

Micronet 800 was quite similar in scope to, and compatible with, the German Bildschirmtext and French Minitel services, but Minitel achieved volume sales for its terminals by the simple expedient of replacing paper telephone books with their terminals. Based on its success, Minitel proved resilient against the Internet adoption in France.

For Micronet, Denton negotiated that the interested parties would all agree to adopt the CET, Council for Educational Technology, format for telesoftware - one of two then competing formats.  Telesoftware allowed users to download software directly from the Prestel site. Micronet then negotiated with hobbyist computer groups to provide applications and utilities that would be listed on, and be downloadable from, the Micronet 800 site. Approximately 50% of software - for Sinclair, Apple, BBC Micro, IBM, etc. - was available at no cost, and the other 50% was paid for by the automatic addition of the cost of the software to the subscriber's telephone bill.

Prism developed a broad range of modems from a simple acoustic coupler to integrated 'network interfaces' for each of the early home and personal computers.  Prism models included the VTX5000, the only modem custom designed for the popular ZX Spectrum, and the more general purpose Modem 1000 and Modem 2000. These were ready-to-use out of a box, so that the buyer would get the modem with all relevant leads, cards (if necessary) and software to connect with Micronet.

Some 25,000 subscribers were eventually signed up to Micronet 800 to make it the largest CUG, Closed User Group, on Prestel; its total user base peaked at 90,000. Micronet achieved over 1.1 million page views a week. Its first subscriber, who joined on its opening day, 1 March 1983, was Jeremy Dredge, an estate agent from Thames Ditton in Surrey. Its 10,000th subscriber was Tom Corcoran, a director of BBC television's Top Of The Pops.

In 1985 Telemap saw that Prism was preoccupied with its Sinclair computer distribution agency and in developing Prism's own 'luggable' Wren microcomputer, so prospective Micronet subscribers were then sent a list of several other modem suppliers.

Following Prism's collapse in 1985 and the subsequent purchase of their stock by Telemap, and in a bid to increase take-up, Micronet 800 encouraged users by giving away a free modem to new users subscribing for a year.

However, in a move that saw the demise of Micronet, Prestel priced the home user out of the service with a new pricing structure, adding time charges on top of the phone charges for evening access which effectively killed off home usage even though the network was under-utilized during the 6pm to 8am time-slot. Today this remains the peak usage time of the Internet.

Many of the lessons learned with respect to online publishing and interactive services were pioneered by Micronet 800 and became every bit as important with the growth of the Internet.

BT became the majority shareholder in 1987 (after a previous 19% Telemap stake had been sold to Bell Canada) initially managing the company as part of BT Spectrum, its Value Added Services Group, before passing the group to BT Prestel. In 1988 the company passed a milestone by becoming the only Value Added Data service to become profitable. In 1989 BT finally acquired the entire company, moved it into a BT building (Dialcom House) in Apsley, just outside Hemel Hempstead in Hertfordshire, and folded the business into first the Dialcom Group along with the rest of the BT Prestel companies and Telecom Gold and subsequently BT Managed Network Services.

In 1991 along with all its online services, BT closed the service deciding to focus on providing network services and transferred the subscriber base to Compuserve which subsequently became AOL in the UK.

The Micronet service closed 31 October 1991. It had 10,000 members at closure and was "easily the largest online service in the UK specialising in microcomputing".  Despite this apparent success, this was less than 10% of the number of users they were predicting having shortly after launch.

Micronet/Telemap Management:

 Richard Hease - chairman and co-founder 1982-1983
 Bob Denton - co-founder 1982-1983
 Tim Schoonmaker - Managing Director 1983-1986
 Ian Rock - Publisher (formerly Marketing Manager) 1983-1986 (Author of 'How To Run The Country Manual')
 Tom Baird - BT liaison
 John Tomany - Managing Director 1987-1990
 Michael Weatherseed - General Manager 1990-1991

Micronet editors:

David Babsky, founding editor
Simon D'Arcy, Editor then Publisher
Sid Smith (author of "Something Like A House", Whitbread award-winning novel), news editor, then editor.
Francis Jago (Now CEO of Fingal, a creative communications agency in London)
Paul Needs, Amstrad & PC staff writer, then editor then managing editor computer and leisure service. Paul is now a professional entertainer and recording artist.
Ian Burley, Micronet's final editor (Now CEO of The Write Technology Ltd, an Internet online publishing business behind Digital Photography Now)
Barbara Conway (died 1991), part-time media editor in the early years of Micronet 800

Other editorial staff
Ken Young - online journo and roving reporter
Adam Denning - original Technical Editor
David Rosenbaum - News Editor and editor of Musicnet
Chris Bourne - Sunday Xtra editor
Paul Vigay - Acorn Editor
Chris Lewis - Sinclair Editor
Ian Burley - Acorn Editor, then News Editor.
Rupert Goodwins - editorial assistant
Afshin Rattansi - music and arts journalist
David Farmbrough - music journalist

Production team:

Robin Wilkinson - publisher in Peterborough, testing, sales and downloading; previously EMAP's Telemap publisher
Val Burgess - previously of Prestel, Micronet 800 telesoftware database manager
Mike Brown - previously of CET, Technical Director
Richard Tyner- Software sales and acquisition,
John Mason - software testing and pricing
John Prout - technical help desk
Denise Shemuel - editorial database manager, London
Colin Morgan
Roger "Woj" Cracknell
Gary Richard Smith
Robert O'Donnell
Patrick Reilly
Daemonn Brody
Denise Slater - graphic designer for downloadable software pages, in Peterborough
Anna Smith - editorial graphic designer in London, then Super sub-editor
Sharon Giles

Marketing Team:
Ian Rock - Marketing Manager
Peter Probert - PR Manager.
Phil Godsell - Product Manager
Lynne Thomas (the late) - Exhibitions Manager
Claire Walker - Advertising and PR Executive
Lynne Bennett - Marketing Executive

Other contributors:

Steve Gold
Robert Schifreen - previously 'Bug Buster' columnist in Richard Hease's 'Computer & Video Games' magazine.
David Janda

Quotes:

"There is no future for online services aimed at domestic computer users" - Michael Collins, the department head of Prestel/Telecom Gold Business Services, stated in a meeting with Paul Needs. [February 1990 - Paul Needs]

"Micronet is to communication in the 80s what the [Gutenberg] Bible was to the Middle Ages" - David Babsky, Micronet Editor, 1984.

Services provided

Micronet 800 pioneered many public online services, such as Multi User Games, long before the Internet was in widespread use.
Chatlines: Users could post messages that other users could see and respond to. Celebrity Chatline was a weekly feature conceived by Publisher Ian Rock and implemented by Sid Smith in which a prominent person was interviewed by Micronet users whose questions appeared onscreen, with Micronet personnel usually typing the answers (if the 'celebrity' couldn't type or format the text themselves). Early 'celebrities' included Sir Clive Sinclair, Feargal Sharkey, Fatima Whitbread and Lord Cardigan.
Downloadable software: Micronet 800 implemented the CET specification that allowed 8 bit files to be transmitted over a 7 bit medium, with some basic error detection and error correction.
Online games: The longest-running game on the system was StarNet, a Play-by-mail game, whereby the players would send in moves which would be executed once a day (a sort of very slow game of chess, where the aim was to become the emperor of the galaxy) run by Liverpudlian Mike Singleton by inputting the moves he was forwarded by email from Micronet into a Commodore PET computer. Micronet 800 also hosted SHADES, one of the first MUDs - a realtime, highly competitive hack-and-slash game that is still running today.
E-mail: Each Prestel user had a unique number (usually the last nine digits of the subscriber's telephone number), and this could be used to send messages. Micronet users were reported to be particularly enthusiastic about the medium, sending twice as many 'mailbox' messages as regular Prestel users. On 1 July 1984 users could send a pre-formatted 'Happy Birthday' email to Princess Diana via Prince Philip, in whose name the Buckingham Palace press office telephone number had been registered as a Prestel user.
Gallery: Conceived by Publisher Ian Rock, this was an area where users could post their own pages about anything they wished, subject to minor oversight for libel and obscenity.
News and reviews: Micronet was frequently the first organisation worldwide to report on happenings in the UK computer industry.

References

External links
The Micronet Story
PrismVTX 5000 modem for Micronet 800
Shades the Game
Celebrating the Viewdata Revolution

BT Group
Legacy systems
Pre–World Wide Web online services
Teletext